is a railway station on the Chikuho Main Line operated by JR Kyushu in Iizuka, Fukuoka Prefecture, Japan.

Lines

Station layout 
The station consists of a side platform serving a single track. Across the track can be seen another, disused side platform as well as the track bed of a second track which has since been removed. The station shares a large two-storey building with the local chamber of commerce and industry. The station part of the building is unstaffed and only houses a waiting room and automatic ticket vending machines. Access to the platform from the station building is by means of a short flight of steps.

Adjacent stations

History 
On 7 December 1929, Kami-Honami became part of the Chikuho Main Line when the Nagao Line was merged with the former. With the privatization of Japanese National Railways (JNR), the successor of JGR, on 1 April 1987, control of the station passed to JR Kyushu.

Station numbering was introduced on 28 September 2018 with Kami-Honami being assigned station number JG02.

References

External links
Kami-Honami Station (JR Kyushu)

Railway stations in Fukuoka Prefecture
Railway stations in Japan opened in 1928